The current Malaysian Minister of Transport is hold by Anthony Loke since 3 December 2022. The minister is supported by Deputy Minister of Transport who has been Hasbi Habibollah since 10 December 2022. The Minister administers the portfolio through the Ministry of Transport.

List of ministers of transport
The following individuals have been appointed as Minister of Transport, or any of its precedent titles:

Political Party:

References

 
Ministry of Transport (Malaysia)
Lists of government ministers of Malaysia
Transport ministers